The 1983 Australian Drivers' Championship was a CAMS sanctioned motor racing title open to drivers of Australian Formula 1 racing cars. The winner of the title, which was the 27th Australian Drivers' Championship, was awarded the 1983 CAMS Gold Star.

Italian born, Melbourne based driver Alfredo Costanzo won his fourth straight CAMS Gold Star driving his Tiga FA81 Ford. John Smith finished second in his Ralt RT4, including being the first Australian driver home in the final round of the championship, the Australian Grand Prix held at Melbourne's Calder Park. Port Macquarie privateer Andrew Miedecke drove his RT4 to 3rd in the championship despite only deciding to race after watching Costanzo win the first round of the series in Adelaide on television.

Calendar
The championship was contested over a six-round series with each round held as a single race.

 Brazilian Roberto Moreno (Ralt RT4 Ford) won the Australian Grand Prix though he was ineligible for championship points. John Smith was the highest place domestic competitor (2nd) thus earning the maximum championship points for the round.

Points system
Championship points were awarded on a 9-6-4-3-2-1 basis to the top six eligible finishers at each round. Non-resident drivers and drivers of Australian Formula 2 cars (who competed in some rounds by invitation) were not eligible to score points.

Results

References

Further reading
 The Official 50 - Race History of the Australian Grand Prix, 1986

External links
 CAMS Online Manual of Motor Sport > About CAMS > Titles – CAMS Gold Star
 Images of 1983 Australian open-wheel racing at www.autopics.com.au

Australian Drivers' Championship
Drivers' Championship